The men's cross-country mountain biking at the 2008 Summer Olympics took place at the Laoshan Mountain Bike Course on August 23, 2008.

France's Julien Absalon pulled away from a pack of mountain bikers at the start to defend his Olympic title in the event with a gold-medal time in 1:55:59. Absalon also enjoyed his teammate Jean-Christophe Péraud taking home the silver in 1:57:06, as the Frenchmen climbed on top of the podium with a spectacular 1–2 finish. Meanwhile, Switzerland's Nino Schurter delivered an exciting sprint challenge for the bronze in 1:57:52, edging out his teammate, three-time Olympian and reigning world champion Christoph Sauser by two seconds. Among the 50 mountain bikers who competed in the cross-country race, only twenty-eight of them managed to complete the full distance.

Competition format
The competition began at 15:00 with a mass-start in which riders are positioned according to their current world ranking so that the higher-ranked riders are near the front. The cross-country race also involved eight laps, with 172 m of elevation change for each, around the 4.45 km course at Laoshan Mountain Bike Course. The overall distance of the race was 35.60 km.

Schedule 
All times are China standard time (UTC+8)

Results

References

Cycling at the 2008 Summer Olympics
Cycling at the Summer Olympics – Men's cross-country
2008 in mountain biking
Men's events at the 2008 Summer Olympics